Elle Kari (original title: Elle Kari), is the title of a book by the Swedish writer Elly Jannes with photos by Anna Riwkin-Brick. In 1951 the book was published by Rabén & Sjögren as the first book in the photo novel series Children's Everywhere. Later authors like Astrid Lindgren, Leah Goldberg, Eugénie Söderberg, Vera Forsberg and Cordelia Edvardson wrote for the same series.

Plot 
Elle Kari is almost four years old and lives in Lapland. There she lives in a house in winter and in summer in a hut made of logs and peat. Elle Kari loves Tjappo, her father's dog. One day Tjappo disappears. Elle Kari is very sad. But then her mother tells Elle Kari that Tjappo and her father will spend the summer in the mountains. There her father makes sure that the wolves do not tear the little reindeer kids apart. When autumn comes, Tjappo returns with the reindeers. Elle Kari is happy. When Elle Kari falls asleep in the evening, Tjappo guards her and thinks that he wants to go back to the mountains, but only if Elle Kari comes along.

Overview 
Elle Kari is the first of 15 books from the series Children's Everywhere. The story is based on true events. However, some things have changed.

The collaboration between Elly Jannes and Anna Riwkin started before the book was written. They wanted make a photo book about the indigenous people of the Sámi as part of an UNESCO project. The photo book entitled Nomads of the North (original title: Vandrande) was addressed to adult readers. During this work, Riwkin also photographed a little girl named Elle Kari and showed the pictures to Elly Jannes. Elly Jannes suggested that Riwkin should create not just the adult book, but also one for children. This was finally published in 1951, with Elly Jannes text. The book was not only Anna Riwkin-Brick's first photo book for children, but also the first Swedish photo book depicting a child's everyday life in an ongoing history. The book was an instant hit. It has been translated into eighteen different languages. The first issue in Germany alone sold over 25,000 times.

Elle Kari achieved a sudden fame after the publication of the book. For a long time she was reported on in newspapers and magazines, even when she was already a teenager. When Elle Kari had a daughter in the 1970s, a Swedish documentary film was filmed about the daughter.

Documentary from Israel 

In Israel, the series Children's Everywhere was a great success. The latter was also based on the translations of the poet Leah Goldberg. In 2014, Israeli director Dvorit Shargal shot a 50-minute documentary titled: Where is Elle-Kari and what happened to Noriko-san?. The film was such a great success that several books from the Children's Everywhere series were reissued in Israel, including Elle Kari. In the documentary, director Dvorit Shargal visits Elle Kari at her home, where Elle Kari speaks about her life. Dvorit Shargal also interviews the daughter of the author Elly Jannes, who was named after Elle Kari.

Editions 
 Elle Kari, Rabén & Sjögren, 1951, Swedish Edition
 Elle Kari, 1952, US-american Edition
 Elle Kari, Methuen, 1962, British Edition
 Elle Kari, Oetinger Verlag, 1952, German Edition
 Elle Kari - Lapin tyttö, Otava, 1962, Finish Edition
 Elle Kari, Gylsendal, 1962, Norwegian Edition
 Elli Kári, Sámi girjjit, 1994, Northern Sami Edition
 Elle Kaari, Sámi girjjit, 1994, Northern Sami Edition
 Elle Kari - historien om en lille pige fra Lapland, Høst og Søns, 1956, Danish Edition

References 

1951 children's books
Methuen Publishing books
Rabén & Sjögren books
Novels set in Sweden